Leatop Plaza is a 66-storey,   late-modernist supertall skyscraper in Guangzhou, China. Leatop Plaza is placed on the site parallel to the East entrance at the central axis of Zhujiang New Town. The construction of the glass and steel-building was completed in July 3th 2012. Design by Francisco Gonzalez-Pulido for JAHN.

See also
List of tallest buildings in Guangzhou
List of tallest buildings in the world

References

Skyscraper office buildings in Guangzhou
Buildings and structures under construction in China
Helmut Jahn buildings